Leon Kasman, pseudonyms "Adam," "Bolek," "Janowski," "Zygmunt" (born 28 October 1905 in Łódź; died 12 July 1984 in Warsaw) was a Polish communist journalist and politician of Jewish descent. Head of the propaganda and agitation department of the Central Committee of the Polish Workers' Party. He was a first editor-in-chief of the Trybuna Ludu daily, deputy to the Sejm of the Polish People's Republic. As a result of the conflicts within the communist party, Kasman resigned from this function in December 1953. He was among the “Puławianie" faction in PZPR. Leon Kasman died in 1984 and was buried at the Powązki Military Cemetery in Warsaw.

See also 
Natolin faction
1968 Polish political crisis
 Władysław Gomułka
 Roman Zambrowski

References 

1905 births
1984 deaths
Politicians from Łódź
People from Piotrków Governorate
Jews from the Russian Empire
Jewish Polish politicians
Communist Party of Poland politicians
Polish Workers' Party politicians
Polish United Workers' Party members
Members of the Polish Sejm 1952–1956
Members of the Polish Sejm 1961–1965
Members of the Polish Sejm 1965–1969
Recipients of the Order of the Banner of Work
Burials at Powązki Military Cemetery
20th-century Polish journalists